Wilczewski is a Polish surname. Notable people with the surname include:

 David Wilczewski (1952–2009), American-Swedish jazz saxophonist
 Mieczysław Wilczewski (1932–1993), Polish cyclist
 Piotr Wilczewski (born 1978), Polish boxer

Polish-language surnames